Joakim Fohlman (born 19 July 1979) is a Swedish serial entrepreneur, author, and philanthropist best known for his initiative to help those affected by crime in Sweden, including the movements Safer Uppsala County and the Foundation for a Safer Sweden. Fohlman's crusade against crime was motivated by his own 
experience of being brutally attacked.

Early life and career
Fohlman was born in 1979 in Uppsala County, Sweden. He started his first business, an advertising agency, at 19 years old and when he was 25 his business grossed over a million dollars. By this time he had also started an internet technology business and the tourist magazine for the city where he lived. It was simultaneously the year he was brutally attacked one night.

Attack
Fohlman was returning from dinner at a restaurant with his girlfriend and some friends when some men they did not know started bothering his girlfriend. Fohlman asked the men to desist from bothering her, and one of them punched him in the nose three times. Fohlman went to the hospital where he was told to come back after the weekend. Then he went to the police and were told that it would take several weeks to process his complaint. He received no information about his right to legal counseling or victim services. "The news left me wondering just how meaningful a police report was," Fohlman said. When he was finally admitted to the hospital, it turned out that he had a broken nose, broken zygomatic bone, broken fundus, and broken cheek bones which required surgery. A titanium plate had to be placed in his face to hold the zygomatic bone in place. Fohlman was left with a permanent disability in the form of face numbness and nose distortion that makes breathing difficult. The restaurant at which Fohlman had eaten the night of his attack posted photos of that evening's guests and Fohlman was able to identify one of them as his attacker. Fohlman also identified the attacker as a former Big Brother reality television show contestant. He thought the judicial process would be quick and easy because of the number of witnesses and positive photo identification of the criminal, but his attacker did not show up for questioning. Fohlman's case languished in the Court of Appeals for four years. After a trial in which Fohlman believes his rights as victim were not respected, the attacker was acquitted. "It really feels like a worse violation than the actual beating," Fohlman said.

Safer Uppsala County

Working with Magnus Lindgren, director of the Victims Unit of the Police in Uppsala county, Fohlman spearheaded Safer Uppsala County to protect crime victims from the kind of abuse and neglect that he experienced. Safer Uppsala County is sponsored by several businesses including Länsförsäkringar, Swedbank, and McDonald's. The organization was first steered by a committee chaired by then Governor Anders Björk. It is now chaired by the current governor. The organization is under the supervision of the police, but it maintains an independent budget.

Foundation for Safer Sweden
The Foundation for Safer Sweden grew out of Safer Uppsala County. Police departments around the country expressed interest in developing programs similar to that of Safer Uppsala County, but they did not follow through.   After a while Fohlman decided to do it on a national scale himself. He went 
on to create the foundation known as Safer Sweden (Tryggare Sverige). Foundation for Safer Sweden was founded on the belief that better forms of collaboration are needed to assist crime victims and deter crime. Safer Sweden performs research and training on crime prevention and security. Safer Sweden provides an ombudsman for victims of crime and has also developed safety guides. The organization is supported by the Swedish Trade Federation, Swedish Housing, and Student Association and many others. It has to date helped over 100,000 people in Sweden.

References 

1979 births
Living people
21st-century Swedish writers
Swedish activists
Anti-crime activists